Lawrence W. Owens (born December 31, 1968) is an American baseball coach and former pitcher. Owens played college baseball at Bellarmine before transferring to Vincennes and Armstrong State and in Minor League Baseball (MiLB) for one season in 1990. He served as the head coach of the Bellarmine Knights (2014–2022).

Playing career
Owens attended Jeffersonville High School in Jeffersonville, Indiana, where he played for the school's baseball teams where he pitched. He then attended Bellarmine University in 1986 before transferring to Vincennes University and ending up at Armstrong State University. In 1988, he played collegiate summer baseball for the Yarmouth–Dennis Red Sox of the Cape Cod Baseball League. As a senior in 1990, Owens was named an honorable mention All-American. He drafted in the 27th round of the 1990 Major League Baseball draft by the Atlanta Braves.

Coaching career
After being the pitching coach for the San Diego Surf Dawgs, Owens joined the Boston Red Sox as an area scout in November, 2005.

On August 7, 2013, Owens was named the head baseball coach at Bellarmine University. Owens resigned from his position with the Knights following the conclusion of the 2022 season. He had a 212–225 record over nine seasons.

Head coaching record

References

External links

Bellarmine Knights profile

1968 births
Living people
Bellarmine Knights baseball players
Vincennes Trailblazers baseball players
Armstrong State Pirates baseball players
Pulaski Braves players
Yarmouth–Dennis Red Sox players
Wabash Valley Warriors baseball coaches
Missouri State Bears baseball coaches
Louisville Cardinals baseball coaches
Memphis Tigers baseball coaches
Bellarmine Knights baseball coaches
Baseball coaches from Indiana